Am I Black Enough for You? is the fourth album by rapper Schoolly D, released in 1989 via Jive Records/RCA. It was produced by Schoolly D and DJ Code Money. The album did not chart, although three singles were released: "Gangster Boogie", "Pussy Ain't Nothin, and "Livin' in the Jungle". It was Schoolly D's last album for Jive Records.

"Am I Black Enough for You?" appears in the 1990 film King of New York.

Critical reception
Trouser Press called Am I Black Enough for You? "a loud and proud album that uses spoken-word bites (political speeches, Star Trek dialogue, Richard Pryor crack-horror routines) to increase the consciousness." The Washington Post wrote that "the raised consciousness and subtler production only make this the rapper's least distinctive effort: There's nothing on this one as abrasively hilarious, or as indubitably Schooly [sic], as the previous platter's 'No More Rock and Roll.'"

Track listing
"Black" – 0:29 
"Gangster Boogie" – 4:06 
 Includes samples from Chicago Gangsters "Gangster Boogie" and James Brown's "King Heroin"
"It's Like Dope" – 3:46 
"D. Is For" – 3:47 
"Black Is..." – 0:30 
"Gucci Again" – 3:42 
"Pussy Ain't Nothin'" – 3:04
 Includes samples from Jimi Hendrix's "Voodoo Child (Slight Return)"
"Black Attack" – 0:40 
"Who's Schoolin' Who?" – 3:17 
"Mama Feelgood" – 3:30 
 Includes samples from Lyn Collins "Mama Feelgood" and "Think(About It)"
"Get off Your Ass and Get Involved" – 1:53 
 Includes samples from James Brown's "Get Up Get Into It Get Involved"
"Education of a Black Man" – 2:29 
"Black Education" – 1:03 
"Livin' in the Jungle" – 3:34 
 Includes samples from Fred Wesley and "The J.B.'s" "Damn Right I'm Somebody"
"Black Jesus" – 3:50 
"Super Nigger" – 1:53 
"Am I Black Enough for You?" – 4:24  
 Includes samples from Billy Paul's "Am I Black Enough for You?" and Maceo & the Macks "Soul Power 74"
"Don't Call Me Nigger" – 3:36 
"Black Power" – 1:03 
"Godfather of Funk" – 3:05
 Includes samples from The J.B.'s "Wine Spot"

Later Samples
"Gucci Again"
"Block Rockin' Beats" by The Chemical Brothers from the album Dig Your Own Hole

References

1989 albums
Schoolly D albums
Jive Records albums
Political hip hop albums
Political music albums by American artists